Fox 44  may refer to one of the following television stations in the United States affiliated with the Fox Broadcasting Company:

KPTH, Sioux City, Iowa
KWKT-TV, Waco, Texas
WFFF-TV, Burlington, Vermont
WGMB-TV, Baton Rouge, Louisiana
WEVV-TV, Evansville, Indiana